The Temporary Committee on the ECHELON Interception System was a Committee of the European Parliament that was set up in 2000 to investigate the global surveillance network ECHELON. The committee issued its final report in 2001.

Background 

On 15 June 2000, the Conference of Presidents of the European Parliament proposed setting up a temporary committee on the ECHELON interception system. The goal of the committee was to confirm the existence of ECHELON and to assess the compatibility of such a system with European law.

The committee was chaired by the Portuguese politician Carlos Coelho. It began investigating the ECHELON system in late 2000.

Final report 

In 2001, the committee concluded that the ECHELON surveillance system "almost certainly" existed, but it also acknowledged that beyond stepping up diplomatic pressure on the Five Eyes to abide by privacy laws, there is not much that the European Union could do to evade their surveillance.

In its final report, the committee noted the following two features of the ECHELON surveillance network that is described as "unusual":

However, due to opposition from major political parties, the report failed to attract much public attention. Carlos Coelho, a Portuguese politician who served as the committee's chairman, remarked that "everyone has chosen to forget this report and its conclusions".

Controversy 

The committee was first proposed by the European Green Party. However, the original plan was scrapped due to opposition from major political groups in the European Parliament. According to critics, the committee has been unable to fully investigate the ECHELON system.

Premature cancellation of delegation trip 

In May 2001, as the committee was finalizing its report on ECHELON, a delegation was sent to Washington, D.C. to investigate the surveillance network, with planned trips to meet U.S. officials from various government bodies including the following agencies and departments:

 U.S. Central Intelligence Agency (CIA)
 U.S. Department of Commerce (DOC)
 U.S. National Security Agency (NSA)

All meetings were cancelled by the U.S. government and the committee was forced to end its trip prematurely. According to a BBC correspondent, "the Americans deny the very existence of the network and, not surprisingly, cold-shouldered the EU delegation".

Several EU member states such as Britain and the Netherlands declined to contribute to the report and refused to co-operate with their parliaments to investigate the ECHELON system.

See also 

 Temporary Committee on the alleged use of European countries by the CIA for the transport and illegal detention of prisoners

References

External links 
 Temporary Committee on the ECHELON Interception System

Committees of the European Parliament